Cristian Ezequiel Llama (born June 26, 1986) is an Argentine football midfielder who plays for San Martín Tucumán.

Club career

Arsenal de Sarandí
Llama began his professional career in his home country of Argentina in 2004, with Arsenal de Sarandí. In his first season with the club, Llama made 16 appearances and scored 2 goals. In his second season, he went on to make an additional 19 appearances. However, the player really thrived in his third season, where he made 23 league starts and managed 4 goals. His impressive displays caught the eyes of numerous European clubs, most notably from Italy, Spain, and Switzerland.

Calcio Catania
On 30 June 2012, the young Argentine completed his European transfer, joining Italian Serie A side, Calcio Catania for a transfer fee of just €300k. The player found playing time hard to come by in his first season at the club, due to the presence of wingers Juan Manuel Vargas, Jorge Andres Martinez, Mariano Izco, and Giacomo Tedesco. After 4 months in Sicily, the player made just 1 appearances, and was, therefore, loaned out to Newell's Old Boys, for the second half of the 2007–08 season, in time for the Argentine Clausura. The loan move was not successful however, and Llama was limited to just 3 appearances, due to injury. After six months in Argentina he was brought back to Calcio Catania under new coach Walter Zenga. In his first full season at Catania, Llama was often regularly featured in Zenga's plans, and made 19 appearances in all competitions. He was also a regular during the 2009–10 season, under coach Gianluca Atzori and later, Siniša Mihajlović, on the left wing, until a major injury struck in March 2010. Prior to the injury, Llama had made 23 league starts scoring 2 goals, and was the "in-form" player following Mihajlovic's appointment as head coach on 8 December 2009. His return was not complete until December 2010. Llama went on to make just 30 league appearances for gli elefanti over the next two seasons.

On 31 August 2012, Llama was sent out on a season-long loan deal to fellow Serie A outfit, ACF Fiorentina, where he rejoined former Catania coach, Vincenzo Montella. After just 5 league appearances, however, the player returned to Sicily on 30 June 2013.

After 5 years playing back home in Argentina, he returned to Catania on 20 July 2018. He was released from his Catania contract by mutual consent on 20 December 2019.

Return to Argentina
In December 2019, Llama signed with Gimnasia Mendoza and returned to the club on 1 January 2020. In January 2022, Llama moved to Ecuadorian Serie A side Mushuc Runa. Llama returned to his homeland in June 2022, as he signed with San Martín de Tucumán.

References

External links
 Argentine Primera statistics  
 Cristian Llama at Football Lineups
 

1986 births
Living people
People from Lomas de Zamora
Argentine footballers
Argentine expatriate footballers
Argentine people of Spanish descent
Association football midfielders
Argentine Primera División players
Serie A players
Serie C players
Liga MX players
Torneo Federal A players
Primera Nacional players
Ecuadorian Serie A players
Arsenal de Sarandí footballers
Newell's Old Boys footballers
Catania S.S.D. players
ACF Fiorentina players
C.D. Veracruz footballers
Club Atlético Colón footballers
Aldosivi footballers
Gimnasia y Esgrima de Mendoza footballers
Mushuc Runa S.C. footballers
San Martín de Tucumán footballers
Expatriate footballers in Italy
Expatriate footballers in Mexico
Expatriate footballers in Ecuador
Argentine expatriate sportspeople in Italy
Argentine expatriate sportspeople in Mexico
Argentine expatriate sportspeople in Ecuador
Sportspeople from Buenos Aires Province